Pulam Sumda is a small hilly village which lies in Uttarkashi District, Uttarakhand, India.

Pulam Sumda is a part of Uttarkashi District, Uttarakhand, India, and claimed by Zanda County, Ngari Prefecture, Tibet, China. Jadh Ganga, an important tributary of the Bhagirathi River, flows through this place. Some of the nearby villages are Jadhang, Sang and Nelang, which all lie in the valley of the Jadh Ganga.

Geography 

See Geography of Dhumku, Nelang, Pulam Sumda, Sumla and Mana Pass area and Geography of Mana.

Culture

This area is are inhabited by the Char Bhutia tribe who practice Tibetan Buddhism.

See also

 India-China Border Roads 
 Line of Actual Control
 List of disputed territories of India

References

Villages in Uttarkashi district